Lygephila lubrica is a moth of the family Erebidae first described by Christian Friedrich Freyer in 1842. It is found from the Zaporizhia region of Ukraine to the Rostov, Samara and Povolzhie regions to the Ural of Russia through Kazakhstan, the Russian Altai to northern Mongolia.

The wingspan is 37–50 mm. The forewings are usually brownish grey but sometimes dark brown. The subbasal line is indistinct and the antemedial line is arched, consisting of two elongated patches. The medial fascia are diffuse with two costal patches. The reniform stigma is triangular and dark brown, with satellite streak-like spots on the outer margin. The orbicular stigma has the form of a small white dot and the postmedial line is distinct. The subterminal line has a light fascia and the terminal line has the form of a black sinuous stripe. The hindwings vary from brown to greyish brown, with a distinct transverse line, as well as a narrow discal spot.

References

Moths described in 1842
Toxocampina